Aye Tha Aung (  also spelt Aye Thar Aung; born: 10 December 1945) is a Burmese politician, former political prisoner and former Deputy Speaker of the Amyotha Hluttaw, the upper house of the Myanmar parliament. In the 2015 election, he contested and won the Rakhine State № 6 constituency for a seat in the country's upper house.

Early life
He is an ethnic Rakhine and was born in Myebon Township, Rakhine State on 10 December 1945. He had only received a high school education. He previously served as a Sergeant Major in the Burmese Army and worked in the Military Industry Corporation. He was dismissed and imprisoned in Mandalay as a result of his underground political activities, and was later released under amnesty in 1974.

Political career

Aye Tha Aung has worked with Aung San Suu Kyi since 1990 when he was a member of the Committee Representing the People’s Parliament (CRPP), formed by the National League for Democracy and victorious ethnic politicians to push for the convening of a parliament seating the 1990 election winners.

He was arrested in 2000 by military intelligence and was handed a 21-year jail sentence for breaking publication and emergency laws. He is believed to have undergone tough interrogation in prison, and has suffered various health problems and had neck surgery. He was released in 2002.

He is a strong defender of the rights of the Buddhist Rakhine people, but he is seen as a less strident nationalist than party leader Aye Maung.

He formerly chaired the Arakan League for Democracy that merged with the Rakhine Nationalities Development Party to form the Arakan National Party in 2014. He is a senior leader of the Arakan National Party, and a longtime political comrade of National League for Democracy leader Aung San Suu Kyi.

During the 2021 Myanmar coup d'état on 1 February, Aye Tha Aung was placed under house arrest by the Myanmar Armed Forces.

References

Prisoners and detainees of Myanmar
Members of the House of Nationalities
1945 births
Living people
Burmese people of Rakhine descent
People from Rakhine State
Arakan National Party politicians
Arakanese politicians